France Planina (29 September 1901 – 14 January 1992) was a Slovene geographer and  cartographer.

Planina was born in Škofja Loka in 1901. He graduated from the University of Ljubljana in 1925 and taught in secondary schools in Otočac, Kranj and Ljubljana. During the Second World War he was interred in the Gonars concentration camp. After the war he continued to teach and also worked at the Natural History Museum of Slovenia. He retired in 1962. He died in Ljubljana in 1992. In 2001 a bronze bust to Planina was unveiled in Škofja Loka.

In 1967 he won the Levstik Award for his book Jugoslavija (Yugoslavia).

References 

1901 births
1992 deaths
Slovenian geographers
Slovenian cartographers
Levstik Award laureates
People from Škofja Loka
University of Ljubljana alumni
Yugoslav geographers
20th-century geographers
20th-century cartographers